The Gerald Loeb Award, also referred to as the Gerald Loeb Award for Distinguished Business and Financial Journalism, is a recognition of excellence in journalism, especially in the fields of business, finance and the economy.  The award was established in 1957 by Gerald Loeb, a founding partner of E.F. Hutton & Co.  Loeb's intention in creating the award was to encourage reporters to inform and protect private investors as well as the general public in the areas of business, finance and the economy.

Gerald Loeb 

Loeb first became known for his book The Battle for Investment Survival, which was popular during the Great Depression and is still considered a classic.  Born in 1899, Loeb began his investing career in 1921 in the bond department of a brokerage firm in San Francisco, California.  He moved to New York in 1921 after joining with E. F. Hutton & Co., and became vice-chairman of the board when the company incorporated in 1962.  The Wall Street Crash of 1929 greatly affected Loeb's investing style, and in his 1971 book The Battle for Stock Market Profits, he viewed the market as a battlefield.  Loeb offered a contrarian investing viewpoint, in books and columns in Barron's, The Wall Street Journal, and Investor Magazine.  Forbes magazine called Loeb "the most quoted man on Wall Street."  He created the Gerald Loeb Award in order to foster further quality reporting for individual investors.

The award 

The award has been administered by the UCLA Anderson School of Management since 1973, and is sponsored by the G. and R. Loeb Foundation.  It is regarded as: "business journalism's highest honor," and its "most prestigious." Beginning with just two winners in 1958 (Werner Renberg and David Steinberg) and expanding to three in the final years before the Anderson School began to administer the award, today there are ten categories in which prizes are awarded: large newspaper, medium newspaper, small newspaper, magazine, commentary, deadline or beat writing, wire services, and television.  Those honored receive a cash prize of US$2,000, and are presented with the award at a ceremony in July of the year following their piece's publication.  The preliminary judging committee includes business, financial and economic journalists, as well as faculty members from the UCLA Anderson School of Management.  Once the finalists are selected, a final panel of judges consisting of representatives from major print and broadcast outlets selects a winner from each category.  The final panel of judges is chaired by the dean of the UCLA Anderson School of Management.  Entries are judged according to their originality, news value, writing quality, thoroughness and balance, and production value.

Award categories
Award categories varied over the years.

Winners
 List of Audio, Video, and Video/Audio winners
 List of Breaking News winners
 List of Broadcast and Broadcast Enterprise winners
 List of Books, Business Books, and Special Book Award winners
 List of Columns, Commentary, and Editorials winners
 List of Deadline and/or Beat Writing, Deadline or Beat Writing, Deadline Writing, Beat Writing, and Beat Reporting winners
 List of Explanatory winners
 List of Feature winners
 List of Gerald Loeb Memorial Award winners
 List of Images, Graphics, Interactives, and Visuals winners
 List of International winners
 List of Investigative winners
 List of Large Newspapers winners
 List of Lifetime Award winners
 List of Local winners
 List of Magazines winners
 List of Minard Editor Award winners
 List of Newspaper winners
 List of News Service, Online, and Blogging winners
 List of Personal Finance and Personal Service winners
 List of Radio winners
 List of Small and Medium Newspapers winners
 List of Special Award winners
 List of Spot News winners
 List of Television winners

See also 

Business journalism
Conscience-in-Media Award
George Polk Awards
Investigative journalism
Worth Bingham Prize

References

Further reading

External links 
About the Gerald Loeb Awards, UCLA Anderson, School of Management.
New Loeb Awards Final Judges Announced by UCLA Anderson School of Management, Business Wire, May 7, 2007
2009 Winners

American journalism awards
Awards established in 1957
1957 establishments in the United States